Kalambha is a small village of the Nagpur district of Maharashtra, India.

References

Villages in Nagpur district